John Nicholas Hayes (5 April 1903 – 16 September 1977) was an Australian rules footballer who played with Fitzroy in the Victorian Football League (VFL).

Notes

External links 

1903 births
1977 deaths
Australian rules footballers from Victoria (Australia)
Fitzroy Football Club players